Vaareva is a 2011 Indian Telugu language romance film produced by Maheshwara Rao under the banner Movie Miracles written and directed by Kalyan Mantena. It stars Goutham, the son of famous comedian Brahmanandam, making a re-entry and newcomer Shambhavi in the lead roles. Ashish Vidyarthi plays an important role. The music is composed by Mahesh Shankar. The film was released on 29 January 2011. RKD Studios owns the film in Hindi and all other Northern Indian languages.

Cast
 Goutham as Rishi
 Shambhavi Sharma as Sandhya 
 Ashish Vidyarthi as Bhupathi 
 Devan as Sandhya's father
 Brahmanandam
 Sayaji Shinde
 Raghu Babu
 Venu Madhav

Soundtrack

Release

References

2011 films
2010s Telugu-language films
Indian romance films
2011 romance films